Megan Craig (born 11 December 1992 in Blenheim, Marlborough) is a professional squash player who represents New Zealand in international competitions. She reached a career-high world ranking of World No. 39 in July 2015.

References

External links 
 
 
 

New Zealand female squash players
Living people
1992 births
Squash players at the 2014 Commonwealth Games
Commonwealth Games competitors for New Zealand
People educated at Marlborough Girls' College